Harbottle is a village and civil parish in Northumberland, England about  south-east of the Scottish border, in the southeastern part of the Cheviot Hills and inside Northumberland National Park. The village is the site of Harbottle Castle built by order of Henry II. Now in ruins, the castle was constructed by the Umfraville family to protect against invaders from Scotland.

Landmarks 

Harbottle Castle is a ruinous medieval castle dated to the 12th century, situated at the west end of the village overlooking the River Coquet. It is a Scheduled Ancient Monument and a Grade I listed building. It is open to the public without charge.

The Drake Stone stands prominently on the hills surrounding Harbottle. The massive sandstone boulder, believed in times past to be endowed with supernatural powers, is a detached sandstone block of Fell Sandstone, which has moved very little from the Fell Sandstone outcrop within which it lies.  It has been compared to the Bowder Stone in Borrowdale, Cumbria, which has also not been moved far. Harbottle Lake is situated just behind the Drake Stone.

Harbottle has a single small public house: The Star Inn.

See also
Harbottle Castle
Alwinton

References

External links

Structures of the North East
Northumberland National Park Historic Village Atlas

Villages in Northumberland
History of Northumberland